Good to Great: Why Some Companies Make the Leap... and Others Don't is a management book by Jim C. Collins that describes how companies transition from being good companies to great companies, and how most companies fail to make the transition. The book was a bestseller, selling four million copies and going far beyond the traditional audience of business books. The book was published on October 16, 2001.

The Good to Great companies

Great companies and their comparators
Collins finds eleven examples of "great companies" and comparators, similar in industry-type and opportunity, but which failed to achieve the good-to-great growth shown in the great companies:

Unsustained companies
Collins includes 6 examples of companies that did not sustain their change to greatness. These companies, "... are looked at separately as a clump":

Response

Praise
The book was "cited by several members of The Wall Street Journal'''s CEO Council as the best management book they've read."Publishers Weekly called it "worthwhile", although "many of Collins' perspectives on running a business are amazingly simple and commonsense".

It was described as "a deeply-researched analysis..." in the Time (magazine) list of The 25 Most Influential Business Management Books.

Criticism
In his 2012 article, The Moral Fox, Peter C. DeMarco identifies the fatal error in Collins' book is placing the good in direct opposition to greatness and, thus, Collins' unintendedly created a proxy for greed. DeMarco goes back to Aesop's original fable to expose and correct the error.

Holt and Cameron state the book provides a "generic business recipe" that ignores "particular strategic opportunities and challenges."

Steven D. Levitt noted that some of the companies selected as "great" have since gotten into serious trouble, such as Circuit City and Fannie Mae, while only Nucor had "dramatically outperformed the stock market" and "Abbott Labs and Wells Fargo have done okay". He further states that investing in the portfolio of the 11 companies covered by the book, in the year of 2001, would actually result in underperforming the S&P 500. Levitt concludes that books like this are "mostly backward-looking" and can't offer a guide for the future."

John Greathouse alleges in a critical review that Collins once made a comment stating, "The books never promised that these companies would always be great, just that they were once great." Greathouse claims the statement was an attempt by Collins to defend the book, and other previous works. Greathouse also represents the view that Collins' book How the Mighty Fall: And Why Some Companies Never Give In blames some of the failed companies themselves for having drastically changed after Collins' books were printed.

Phil Rosenzweig describes errors in the fundamental research assumptions of Good to Great. First, heavy reliance on magazine articles as research introduce sources littered with halo effects. He also notes the Wrong End of the Stick delusion used in the hedgehog claims of the book in that successful companies have a luxury of focus which is not possible for less successful companies. Finally, he notes the presence of the Organizational Physics delusion in that Collins does not carefully avoid confusing correlation with causation. 

See alsoBuilt to Last: Successful Habits of Visionary Companies by James C. Collins and Jerry I. PorrasGreat by Choice: Uncertainty, Chaos and Luck - Why Some Thrive Despite Them All by James C. CollinsGreat at Work: How Top Performers Do Less, Work Better, and Achieve More by Morten T. HansenThe Halo EffectIn Search of Excellence'' by Thomas J. Peters and Robert H. Waterman

References

External links
 Wiki Chapter Summaries of Good to Great
 Good To Great Best Business & Economics Audiobook

2001 non-fiction books
Business books
William Collins, Sons books